Huarte or Uharte is a town and municipality located in the province and autonomous community of Navarre, northern Spain.

References

External links
Ayuntamiento de Huarte
 HUARTE - UHARTE in the Bernardo Estornés Lasa - Auñamendi Encyclopedia (Euskomedia Fundazioa) 

Municipalities in Navarre